Bengower at , is the 135th–highest peak in Ireland on the Arderin scale, and the 166th–highest peak on the Vandeleur-Lynam scale.  Bengower is in the southern end of the Twelve Bens mountain range in the Connemara National Park in Galway, Ireland, and is the 6th-tallest of the core Twelve Bens.

Naming
Irish academic Paul Tempan notes that there is no evidence as to the origin of the "goat" reference, however, he notes that the mountain was mistakenly labelled as "Glengower" in the popular Discovery Map series.

Geography

Bengower lies between the summits of Benbreen , to the north, and Benlettery , and Benglenisky , to the south.

Bengower’s prominence of  qualifies it as a Marilyn, and it also ranks it as the 86th-highest mountain in Ireland in the MountainViews Online Database, 100 Highest Irish Mountains, where the prominence threshold is 100 metres.

Hill walking
Because of its positioning, the more straightforward routes to climb Bengower usually follow a 7-kilometre 3-4 hour horseshoe loop-walk with the neighbouring peaks of Benlettery and Benglenisky.

Bengower is often climbed as part of the popular 16–kilometre 8–9 hour Glencoaghan Horseshoe, considered one of Ireland's best hill-walks.  Bengower is also climbed as part of the longer Owenglin Horseshoe, a 20–kilometre 10–12 hour route around the Owenglin River taking in over twelve summits.

Gallery

Bibliography

See also

Twelve Bens
Mweelrea, major range in Killary Harbour
Maumturks, major range in Connemara
Lists of mountains in Ireland
Lists of mountains and hills in the British Isles
List of Marilyns in the British Isles
List of Hewitt mountains in England, Wales and Ireland

References

External links
MountainViews: The Irish Mountain Website, Bengower
MountainViews: Irish Online Mountain Database
The Database of British and Irish Hills , the largest database of British Isles mountains ("DoBIH")
Hill Bagging UK & Ireland, the searchable interface for the DoBIH

Marilyns of Ireland
Hewitts of Ireland
Mountains and hills of County Galway
Geography of County Galway
Mountains under 1000 metres